is one of four wards of Okayama, Okayama Prefecture, Japan. The ward has an area of 127.36 km² and a population of 165,193. The population density is 1,297 per square kilometer. The name means "South Ward."

The wards of Okayama were established when Okayama became a city designated by government ordinance on April 1, 2009.

External links 

 岡山市南区役所 (Ward office official home page)

Wards of Okayama